The Love Connection is a 1979 album by jazz trumpeter Freddie Hubbard that was recorded and released by Columbia and with performances by Tom Scott, Buddy Collette, Chick Corea, Stanley Clarke, and Al Jarreau.

Track listing
All compositions by Freddie Hubbard except where noted

 "Love Connection" – 8:17
 "Brigitte" – 6:57
 "This Dream" (Claus Ogerman) – 9:00
 "Little Sunflower" (Hubbard, Jarreau) – 9:20
 "Lazy Afternoon" (Jerome Moross, John La Touche) – 10:02

Personnel
 Freddie Hubbard − trumpet, flugelhorn
 Oscar Brashear, Snooky Young, Chuck Findley, Steve Madaio − trumpet
 Dick "Slyde" Hyde, Phil Ranelin, Phil Teele − trombone
 Joe Farrell, Tom Scott, Ernie Watts, Buddy Collette − tenor saxophone, flute
 Chick Corea − keyboards
 Chuck Domanico, Stanley Clarke − bass guitar
 Chester Thompson − drums
 Jumma Santos, Rubens Bassini − percussion
 Al Jarreau − vocals
 Claus Ogerman − conductor, arranger

References

External links

1979 albums
Freddie Hubbard albums
Albums conducted by Claus Ogerman
Albums produced by Claus Ogerman
Columbia Records albums